The ATM Turbo (ru: "АТМ-ТУРБО"), also known simply as ATM (from ru: "Ассоциация Творческой Молодёжи", meaning "Association of Creative Youth") is a ZX Spectrum clone, developed in Moscow in 1991, by two firms, MicroArt and ATM.

The ATM can be emulated in Unreal Speccy v0.27 and higher.

History 
ATM was developed in 1991 based on the Pentagon, a ZX Spectrum clone popular in Russia. In 1992 an upgraded model was introduced, named ATM Turbo 2. Up to 1994 the computer was produced by ATM and MicroArt; later the firms separated and production ended.

In 2004 NedoPC from Moscow resumed production. New versions called ATM Turbo 2+ and ZX Evolution were introduced.

Characteristics

Graphics modes 
For compatibility purposes, the original  ZX Spectrum mode is available.

New graphics modes offer expanded abilities: 
 mode, with 2 out of 16 colors per 8x1 pixels. The Profi offers a similar mode, but the ATM can use the full  set for both ink and paper.
 mode with a  raster mode (a two-pixel chunky mode, not planar like EGA). Two games for this mode were converted directly from PC: Prince of Persia and Goblins, and one from Sony PlayStation: Time Gal. Other games that use this mode exist, like Ball Quest, released in August, 2006.

Palette:
  from a 64 color palette (6-bit RGB) can be set for all modes.

Operating systems 
48K Sinclair BASIC, 128K Sinclair BASIC, TR-DOS, CP/M, iS-DOS, TASiS, DNA OS, Mr Gluk Reset Service.

Software 
 ATM Turbo
 Virtual TR-DOS

Models 
Many models exist. Models before version 6.00 are called ATM 1, later models are called ATM 2(2+) or ATM Turbo 2(2+) or simply Turbo 2+. A IDE interface is available since v6.00.JIO0UBH9BY8B9T7GVC6R (the latest model is 7.18).

ATM Turbo 1 (1991):ru:ATM Turbo
Processor: Zilog Z80 at 3.5 and 7 MHz (turbo mode)
RAM: 128 to 512 KB
ROM: 64 to 128 KB
Memory manager: standard for ZX Spectrum 128 (memory over 64KB is addressed through a window in the upper 16KB of address space), with the ability to include a zero page of RAM in the lower 16KB of the address space
Graphics video modes: Standard ZX Spectrum mode (256x192, 2 colors per block of 8x8 pixels from 16 colors); 320x200 with 16 colors per pixel; 640x200 high resolution mode with 2 out of 16 colors per 8x1 pixels
Color palette: 64 colors, 16 can be used at the same time
Firmware: 48K BASIC / 128K BASIC; TR-DOS; CP/M 2.2
Supported external drives: tape recorder (audio cassette); disk drive
Sound devices: standard 1-bit beeper; AY-3-8910; Covox
Additional devices: SECAM encoder for connection to a color TV; single-channel DAC; modem; parallel interface for connecting a printer; stereo audio amplifier (2x1W)
Keyboard: mechanical matrix, standard ZX Spectrum layout (40 keys) or extended (64 keys)

ATM Turbo 2 (1993)
New features (relative to ATM Turbo 1):
Memory manager: the ability to include any page of RAM or ROM in any of the quarters of the address space
Text mode: 80x25 text video mode, characters are stored in the character generator ROM. It is possible to set any of 16 colors for the symbol and background
Hardware vertical scrolling in 320x200 and 640x200 modes
Supported external drives: controller for IDE devices (hard drives of any capacity, CD-ROM ); Digital PLL added to floppy controller
Additional devices: eight-channel DAC
Keyboard: XT keyboard support, on-chip RAM 537RU10
Removed: SECAM encoder

ATM Turbo 2+
New features (comparing to ATM Turbo 2):
RAM: 128 to 1024 KB
Additional devices: RS-232 interface; channel switch for DAC
Keyboard: support for XT and AT keyboards, based on the 1816BE31 (i8031) microcontroller
The xBIOS ROM has been specially developed for ATM Turbo 2+ with support for virtual floppies
ROM version of Mr Gluk Reset Service
Removed: Modem

ZX Evolution
New features (comparing to ATM Turbo 2+):
Turbo mode up to 14 MHz, switchable via menu and software
RAM: 4MB 
2 expansion slots according to the ZXBUS standard, for connecting General Sound, etc.
Flexible architecture based on FPGA (EP1K50) - third-party firmware available
SD card with transparent BIOS support (EVO RESET SERVICE)
Added VGA video output
Non-volatile clock according to Mr Gluk standard, IDE interface according to Nemo standard, mouse according to Kempston Mouse standard 
Video scan rate similar to that of the Pentagon, with full support of border and multicolor effects

References

Computer-related introductions in 1991
ZX Spectrum clones
Soviet computer systems